Intentional harassment, alarm or distress is a statutory offence in England and Wales. It is an aggravated form of the offence of harassment, alarm or distress under section 5 of the Public Order Act 1986.

The offence

The offence is created by section 4A of the Public Order Act 1986, which was inserted by section 154 of the Criminal Justice and Public Order Act 1994:

Mode of trial and sentence

This is a summary offence. It is punishable with imprisonment for a term not exceeding six months, or a fine not exceeding level 5 on the standard scale, or both.

Arrest
Section 4A(4) of the 1986 Act formerly provided that a constable (or designated person) could arrest without warrant anyone he reasonably suspected was committing this offence. This was repealed by section 174 of, and Part 2 of Schedule 17 to, the Serious Organised Crime and Police Act 2005.

Racially or religiously aggravated offence

Section 31(1)(b) of the Crime and Disorder Act 1998 (c.37) creates the distinct offence of racially or religiously aggravated intentional harassment, alarm or distress.

Notes

References
 Blackstones Police Manual Volume 4 General police duties, Fraser Simpson (2006). pp. 251. Oxford University Press. 
 Rowan Atkinson's speech at Reform Section 5 Parliamentary reception – YouTube

Freedom of speech
Harassment
English legal terminology